Powers of Ten; Live! is a live album by guitarist Shawn Lane, released in 2001 through Eye Reckon Records. This was to be Lane's final solo effort, before his death in 2003.

Track listing

Personnel
Shawn Lane – guitar, production
Doug Scarborough – keyboard
Sean Rickman – drums
Barry Bays – bass
Todd Bobo – saxophone
Bruce Dees – digital editing
Michael Patterson – digital editing
Denny Purcell – mastering
Les Birchfield – executive production

References

Shawn Lane albums
2001 live albums